The People's Republic of Korea (PRK) was a short-lived provisional government that was organized at the time of the surrender of the Empire of Japan at the end of World War II. It was proclaimed on 6 September 1945, as Korea was being divided into two occupation zones, with the Soviet Union occupying the north and the United States occupying the south. Based on a network of people's committees, it presented a program of radical social change.

In the south, the US military government outlawed the PRK on 12 December 1945. In the north, the Soviet authorities took over the PRK by installing pro-Soviet Korean communists such as Kim Il-sung into positions of power and incorporated it into the political structure of the emerging Democratic People's Republic of Korea (North Korea).

History

Establishment

On 15 August 1945, the Japanese Empire surrendered to the Allies. The Imperial Japanese authorities requested that a government be established to ensure the safety of their persons and property after the occupation ended. Whilst the Soviet Union continued to fight the Japanese Empire in Chongjin, who served in the Japanese Government-General sought to secure the return of the Japanese. He proposed to Song Jin-woo that he take over the security and administrative rights of Korea, but when this was rejected, he asked to meet Lyuh Woon-hyung in Seoul. Under Lyuh's leadership, the newly formed Committee for the Preparation of Korean Independence (CPKI) organized people's committees throughout the country to coordinate the transition to independence. On 28 August 1945 the CPKI announced that it would function as the temporary national government of Korea. On 6 September, CPKI activists met in Seoul and established the PRK.

Security and administrative rights were transferred to Lyuh, and the safety of the Japanese evacuating the Korean Peninsula was guaranteed. Accordingly, Lyuh suggested the following conditions:
 Immediate release of political prisoners and economic prisoners across the country.
 Secure food for three months in August, September and October.
 Don't interfere with political activities.
 Don't interfere with the education of students and youth.
 Don't interfere with the mobilization of workers and peasants into workers' councils.

Accordingly, the Governor-General's Deputy Prime Minister accepted the terms. That night, Lyuh Woon-hyung launched the National Preparatory Committee, basing its structure on the Founding Alliance, an underground secret independence movement that he had formed a year before in August 1944. Subsequently, Lyuh released all the political prisoners in Seodaemun Prison. Two days after the founding of the National Preparatory Committee was established, a systematic organizational network was established, expanded and reorganized. Lyuh was elected chairman and An Jae-hong as Vice-chairman, who made the following declaration:

Deployment

The PRK has great significance in that it is the first Korean political organization to implement local autonomy, in the form of the people's committees. By the end of August, more than 140 committees were established nationwide in response to the support of the people.

The organizational work of the National Preparatory Committee was also carried out in North Korea. The leader in the North Korean region was Cho Man-sik, a native of Pyongyang, who 'took a non-violent yet uncompromising route' during the Japanese colonial period. Under different regional conditions in the south and north of the Korean Peninsula, Lyuh Woon-hyung and Cho Man-sik simultaneously launched the founding project.

The organization had different names and differences in composition, depending on whether it was led by communists or nationalists. It also provided a foundation for the construction of a new nation as a 'people's self-governing organization', created by both nationalists and socialists who had been engaged in the independence movement during the Japanese colonial period.

, a professor of history at Sungkyunkwan University, said, 'If there was no organization like the people's committees after liberation, there would have been great confusion. This is because major independence movement groups, including the Provisional Government of the Republic of Korea, were far abroad. However, before the liberation, the founding alliance was organized mainly by domestic groups, who were able to voluntarily perform major tasks such as security and administration.'

Program
The program of the PRK was presented in its 14 September twenty-seven point program. The program included: "the confiscation without compensation of lands held by the Japanese and collaborators; free distribution of that land to the peasants; rent limits on the nonredistributed land; nationalization of such major industries as mining, transportation, banking, and communication; state supervision of small and mid-sized companies;... guaranteed basic human rights and freedoms, including those of speech, press, assembly, and faith; universal suffrage to adults over the age of eighteen; equality for women; labor law reforms including an eight-hour day, a minimum wage, and prohibition of child labor; and "establishment of close relations with the United States, USSR, United Kingdom, and China, and positive opposition to any foreign influences interfering with the domestic affairs of the state." Accordingly, the motto of the PRK was "Self-reliant and independent state".

Developments

Communist takeover in the North
When Soviet troops entered Pyongyang on 24 August 1945, they found a local People's Committee established there, led by veteran Christian nationalist Cho Man-sik. While the Soviet authorities initially recognized and worked with the People's Committees, they made determined efforts to ensure that Koreans friendly to their political interests, especially Korean communists, were placed into positions of power. Immediately after entering Korea, Soviet officials set about shifting the political center of the Peoples' Committees to the political left, and installed a number of Korean communists into the Peoples' Committees until eventually they formed the majority in these organizations. 

By some accounts, Cho Man-sik was the Soviet government's first choice to lead North Korea. However in December 1945, at the Moscow Conference, the Soviet Union agreed to a US proposal for a trusteeship over Korea for up to five years in the lead-up to independence. Most Koreans demanded independence immediately, which included Cho Man-sik, who opposed the proposal at a public meeting on 4 January 1946. Afterwards, he disappeared into house arrest. He was replaced by Kim Il-sung, who alongside most of the Koreans Communists had supported the trusteeship under pressure from the Soviet government. On 8 February 1946, the People's Committees were reorganized as Interim People's Committees dominated by Communists. The new regime instituted popular policies of land redistribution, industry nationalization, labor law reform, and equality for women. Meanwhile, existing Communist groups were reconstituted as the Workers' Party of Korea under Kim Il-sung's leadership.

After the failure of negotiations for unification, the Democratic People's Republic of Korea (DPRK) was proclaimed on 9 September 1948, with Kim Il-sung as premier.

Suppression in the South
After the American arrival in September 1945, the United States Army Military Government in Korea controlled the peninsula south of the 38th parallel. The military governor Lieutenant-General John R. Hodge refused to recognize the PRK and its People's Committees, and outlawed it on 12 December. He later stated, "one of our missions was to break down this Communist government". On 19 July 1947, Lyuh Woon-hyung was assassinated by Han Ji-geun, a member of the far-right group .

Edgar Snow, an American journalist, returned to Korea after its liberation and stayed for two months to report on the situation:

Some local units of the People's Republic remained active in the Jeolla region  and especially on Jeju Island, where their presence, together with marauding anti-communist youth gangs, contributed to tensions that exploded in the events known as Jeju uprising of 1948–1949.

Countrywide 

Early November saw the creation of the National Council of Korean Labor Unions (NCKLU) and its endorsement of PRK and its program. December saw the creation of the National League of Peasant Unions, the Korean Democratic Youth League, and the Women's League, and their support of the PRK.

Central People's Committee 
 Chairman: Lyuh Woon-hyung
 Prime Minister: Ho Hon
 Director of Home Affairs: Kim Gu
 Director of Foreign Affairs: Kim Kyu-sik
 Director of Finance: Cho Man-sik
 Director of Military: Kim Won-bong
 Director of Economy: Ha Pilwon
 Director of Agriculture and Forestry: Bong Mi-seon
 Director of Health: Lee Man-Gyu
 Director of Transport: Hong Nam-pyo
 Director of Security: Choi Yong-Dal
 Chief Justice: Kim Byung-ro
 Director of Education: Kim Seong-su
 Director of Propaganda: Kwan-Sul Lee
 Director of Communications: Sin Ik-hui
 Director of Labor: Lee Sang-Hyuk
 General Secretary: Yi Kang-guk
 Director of Legal Affairs: Choi Ikhan
 Director of Planning: Jeong Baek

See also 
 Division of Korea

Notes

References

Allied occupation of Korea
1945 in North Korea
1946 in North Korea
1945 in South Korea
1946 in South Korea
Political history of Korea
Korea, People's Republic of